Britain's Brightest is a game show that aired on BBC One from 5 January to 9 February 2013 and was hosted by Clare Balding.

Format
Britain's Brightest is an adaptation of the German format Der klügste Deutsche (internationally promoted as The Nation's Brightest). The format is for 24 ordinary people to have their intelligence tested in a variety of ways including memory, speed and emotional intelligence.  It is thus similar to other game shows which aimed to test a range of mental faculties such as The Krypton Factor and Britain's Best Brain. The competition is staged as a knock-out in which the winner is the best all-round performer. The contestants compete for a prize of £50,000. There are VTs of Street Science presented by Steve Mould testing the public with science stunts and amazing facts.

References

External links

2010s British game shows
2013 British television series debuts
2013 British television series endings
BBC television game shows
Television series by Banijay